Emory Jones (born April 29, 2000) is an American football quarterback for Cincinnati. Jones began his college football career at Florida in 2018 before transferring to Arizona State in 2022.

Early life and high school
Jones grew up in LaGrange, Georgia, and attended Heard County High School. As a senior, he completed 61 of 103 passes for 1,197 yards and 10 touchdowns while also rushing for 494 yards and six touchdowns. Jones was rated a four star recruit and initially committed to play college football at Ohio State over offers from Clemson and Tennessee. He decommitted from Ohio State and instead signed to play at Florida.

College career

Florida 
Jones played in four games before redshirting his true freshman season, completing 12 of 16 pass attempts for 125 yards and two touchdowns. As a redshirt freshman, he completed 25 of 38 pass attempts for 267 yards and three touchdowns and also rushed 42 times for 256 yards and four touchdowns. He continued to be used in package plays while also serving as the backup to starter Kyle Trask.

Jones was the Gators' starting quarterback to start their 2021 season.

On March 18, 2022, Jones confirmed to his coaches that he would be entering the transfer portal.

Arizona State 

On May 5, 2022, Jones transferred to Arizona State. 

On December 12, 2022, Jones entered the transfer portal again.

Cincinnati 
On December 21, 2022, Jones committed to Cincinnati under new Head Coach Scott Satterfield.

Statistics

References

External links
Florida Gators bio
Arizona State Sun Devils bio
Cincinnati Bearcats bio

Living people
Players of American football from Georgia (U.S. state)
American football quarterbacks
Florida Gators football players
People from LaGrange, Georgia
2000 births
Arizona State Sun Devils football players
Cincinnati Bearcats football players